WGAC-FM is a radio station located in Augusta, Georgia. The station is licensed by the Federal Communications Commission (FCC) to the town of Harlem and broadcast on 95.1 FM with an effective radiated power (ERP) of 5.7 kW. It simulcasts a news/talk format with WGAC 580.  Its studios are located just two blocks from the Augusta-Richmond County border in unincorporated Columbia County, Georgia and the transmitter is in Grovetown, Georgia at the interchange of Interstate 20 and GA 388.

History
WGAC-FM signed on in November 1992 as an alternative rock outlet named "Channel Z 95.1", giving the area its first station playing that type of music. Although the station had a small but loyal audience, it was handicapped with a signal that covered 2/3 of the Augusta/Aiken market. It was nominated in 1996 for "Small Market Station Of The Year" as well as then-Music Director Johnny Cage for "Music Director Of The Year" by Billboard Radio Monitor and was voted "Best Radio Station" in 1995 and 1996 by readers of "Augusta Magazine".

The "Channel Z" era of WGAC-FM from 1992-1996 has been referred to as  "purest form of rock ‘n’ roll to be found anywhere on Augusta airwaves." That era has been memorialized on the Channel Z 95.1 Preservation Project website.

The station signed a local marketing agreement on December 10, 1996 with Beasley Broadcasting (who later purchased it) and the format was flipped to 1970s oldies as "Z95". After about a year with mostly dismal ratings, the station flipped to active rock as "95 Rock" in September 1998.

On August 10, 2011, WCHZ's rock format moved to 93.1 FM WGAC-FM, a much lower powered signal licensed to Warrenton, GA, moving the FM simulcast of the talk format from 93.1 WGAC-FM to the stronger 95.1 WCHZ. Five days later, the stations also swapped call signs.

See also

Media in Augusta, Georgia

References

External links
WGAC official website

GAC-FM
Radio stations established in 1992
GAC-FM